Qubodiyon, also Qubadiyan, ancient Kobadiyan (Qobādiyān) is a town in the Khatlon Region of Tajikistan. It is the capital of Qubodiyon District. The population of the town is 12,200 (January 2020 estimate). Qubodiyon was possibly founded by the Sasanian king Kavad I during his exile in the Hephthalite Empire, where the town possibly served as his source of revenue.

Nasir Khusraw, a Persian poet, philosopher, Isma'ili scholar, traveler and one of the greatest writers in Persian literature was born in the village in 1004 CE. 

The Oxus Treasure was found near Kobadiyan.

References

Sources

External links
 

Populated places in Khatlon Region